Joe Regalbuto (born August 24, 1949) is an American actor and director. He is known for his role as Frank Fontana on the CBS television sitcom Murphy Brown, which earned him a Primetime Emmy Award nomination in 1989.

Early life
Regalbuto graduated from New Milford High School in New Milford, New Jersey, in 1967.

Career
After some bits and guest appearances, he had his first major role as attorney Elliot Streeter in the acclaimed but short-lived legal sitcom The Associates, which aired from 1979-80.

In 1982 Joe Regalbuto played a supporting role in the critically acclaimed film Missing, as well as the role of Darius in the cult sci-fi/fantasy movie The Sword and the Sorcerer, and, on television, the recurring role of Kalnik the evil alien in three episodes of Mork & Mindy.

He starred in the CBS series Knots Landing in the 1984–1985 and 1985–1986 seasons as Harry Fisher, a man who takes possession of the Ewing twins illegally, which centered on the Black Market storyline.  

In 1984 he appeared in the TV movie Invitation to Hell, directed by Wes Craven.

In 1985 Regalbuto increased his household recognition when he guest starred as cab driver and high school friend, Don Eddie Rice, in the television series Magnum, P.I. episode "Going Home". A year earlier, he co-starred with Magnum, P.I. star Tom Selleck in Selleck's 2nd film, Lassiter.

In 1986 Regalbuto starred in the TV movie Fuzz Bucket and a short-lived series, Street Hawk, and co-starred in the short-lived 1979 sitcom The Associates with Martin Short. 

In 1988, he played the part of Rebecca Devereaux's verbally abusive boyfriend, Jeremy, in the TV series The Golden Girls.

Joe starred in Murphy Brown for the entire first run of the acclaimed series from November 14, 1988 to May 18, 1998. 

He appeared on a uncredited role in the 1992 movie The Babe.

Late in the series, Regalbuto directed more than 20 episodes of Murphy Brown. He also has directed episodes of 
“ Friends “,Titus, George Lopez, Wizards of Waverly Place and other television programs. Regalbuto also was an early spokesman for DirecTV when it first came out.

In 2002, he appeared on the final season (5th) of the Ally McBeal TV series, episode 10, "One Hundred Tears", as Harvey Hall, a man who believed he could fly, using wings of his own making.  

In 2008, he had a small role in the movie Bottle Shock.
In 2008, he also had guest roles in the TV series Ghost Whisperer and Criminal Minds. 
In 2009, Regalbuto had a guest appearance on NCIS.

In 2012, he played the critically acclaimed part of Mr Rogers in the TV Series Southland: "his character feigned grief in what Det. Lydia Adams (Regina King) called 'an Academy Award-winning performance.' He's not eligible for an Oscar, but Regalbuto might just get an Emmy".

He has also directed episodes of Hot in Cleveland - Season 3, Episode 5 in 2011 and Season 4, Episodes 6 and 7 in 2013.

In 2015, he had a guest role as Stuart "Stu" Sloan in episode 4, "Turn Down", of season 4 in the TV series Major Crimes.

On February 26, 2018, it was announced that Regalbuto would return to a revival series of Murphy Brown along with former co-stars Candice Bergen, Faith Ford and Grant Shaud.

References

External links
 

1949 births
Living people
Male actors from New York City
American male film actors
American male television actors
American television directors
People from Brooklyn
People from New Milford, New Jersey